Tatoeba is a  free collection of example sentences with translations geared towards foreign language learners. Its name comes from the Japanese phrase "tatoeba", meaning "for example". It is written and maintained by a community of volunteers through a model of open collaboration. Individual contributors are known as Tatoebans. It is hosted by Association Tatoeba, a French non-profit organization funded through donations.

As of November 2022, the Tatoeba Corpus has over 10,800,000 sentences in 420 languages. 55 of these languages have 10,000 or more sentences. About 1 million sentences have audio recordings. 

The sentences are interrelated within a graph, facilitating translations in different languages. As of November 2022, the Tatoeba Graph lists over 21,800,000 links between sentences. 237 language pairs have over 10,000 translated sentences.

History

In 2006, Trang Ho was frustrated that unlike some of their Japanese counterparts, German bilingual dictionaries didn't feature full-text search of usage examples with translations. It led her to imagine her ideal dictionary and to build a prototype hosted on SourceForge under the name "multilangdict." The main focus was already the crowdsourcing of translated sentences: "A Wikipedia type of thing, except people add sentences, not articles."

Alongside her studies at the University of Technology of Compiègne, Trang Ho gradually improved her website with a few classmates. She rebuilt the project from scratch twice and rebranded it as Tatoeba. In September 2007, about 150,000 English-Japanese sentence pairs from the Tanaka Corpus — a public-domain compilation released in 2001 by Hyogo University professor Yasuhito Tanaka and maintained by Jim Breen and Paul Blay — were imported into the Tatoeba Corpus. In December 2008, Trang Ho released the first version of the current codebase built around a more flexible data model. The following month, the website moved to the tatoeba.org domain.

Over the 2009-2010 academic year, Allan Simon — then a student at SUPINFO — became a core developer of Tatoeba. Together with Trang Ho and other young developers, they made Tatoeba more social: sentence lists, user profiles, private messaging, and Facebook-inspired Wall. They also introduced significant features like sentence linking, tagging, and "translation of translation" search. In November 2010, Tatoeba passed the 600,000 sentences mark. Within a year, the number of sentences added daily had increased almost 50-fold.

Between 2014 and 2016, a new team of developers formed around Trang Ho.  They mentored students at the Google Summer of Code 2014 and added features to improve corpus quality. 

Over the 2018-2020 period, support from the Mozilla Foundation as part of the Common Voice project allowed Tatoeba to make its platform more open and user-friendly.

Openness

Reading 
Users, even those who are not registered, can search for words in any language to retrieve sentences that use them.  Each sentence in the Tatoeba Corpus is displayed next to its likely translations in other languages; translations and "translations of translations" are differentiated.  Sentences are tagged for content such as subject matter, dialect, or vulgarity; they also each have individual comment threads to facilitate feedback and corrections from other users and cultural notes. Sentences can be browsed by language, tag, and other criteria.

Editing 
Registered users can add new sentences or translate or proofread existing ones, even if their target language is not their native tongue. However, users are encouraged to add original sentences or translations in their native or strongest language.

Users can freely edit their sentences, "adopt" and correct sentences without an owner, and comment on others' sentences.  Advanced contributors, a rank above ordinary contributors, can tag, link, and unlink sentences. Corpus maintainers, a rank above advanced contributors, can untag and delete sentences. They can also modify owned sentences, though they typically do so only if the owner fails to respond to a request to make the change.

Operation 
Tatoeba received a grant from Mozilla Drumbeat in December 2010.

Some work on the Tatoeba infrastructure was sponsored by Google Summer of Code, 2014 edition.

In May 2018 they received a $25,000 Mozilla Open Source Support (MOSS) program grant.

In August 2019 they received a $15,000 Mozilla Open Source Support (MOSS) program grant.

Access to content

Content licensing 
By default, the sentences of the Tatoeba Corpus are published under a Creative Commons Attribution 2.0 license, freeing it for academic and other use. Users can also contribute sentences under Creative Commons Zero, though translations of those sentences currently can't share the same license.

Audio recordings of the sentences use the speaker's choice of license, such as CC BY 4.0, BY-SA, BY-NC, or no public license at all.

Offline use 
Visitors can download tab-delimited sentence pairs ready for import into Anki and similar Spaced Repetition Software at the Tatoeba website.

Related projects

Second-language acquisition 
Tatoeba sentences can be used to build lexicographic references for language learners. The JMdict Japanese-English dictionary selects its example sentences from the Tatoeba Corpus. OpenRussian is a free Russian dictionary built primarily from the content of Wiktionary and Tatoeba. GoodExample tries to automatically extract a diverse set of high-quality example sentences from the English Tatoeba Corpus. 

Tatoeba datasets can power incidental learning experiences that blend the acquisition of a foreign language with the user's everyday activities like web browsing or book reading. A team at MIT Media Lab used example sentences from Tatoeba in WordSense, a mixed reality platform that enables "serendipitous language learning in the wild." More recently, Japanese researchers implemented a Tatoeba search feature in an integrated writing assistance environment. Reverso uses Tatoeba parallel corpora in its bilingual concordancer.

Example sentences are also used as a base for exercises. Charles Kelly and Paul Raine, both EFL teachers in Japan, have developed language learning activities based on sentences curated from the Tatoeba Corpus. Clozemaster is a language self-study program that generates gamified cloze tests from Tatoeba sentence pairs. Some Anki users share flashcards that were created using Tatoeba.

Regional or minority languages 
Some language digital activists contribute to open collaborative projects like Tatoeba, Wikipedia, and Common Voice to promote their minority language in digital spaces. Regional languages like Kabyle, Catalan, or Basque can register more than a hundred members on Tatoeba.

Constructed languages 
Selected content from Tatoeba in Esperanto is available in the multilingual DVD Esperanto Elektronike published by E@I. As of November 2022, Esperanto is Tatoeba's fifth pivot language, with over 330,000 sentences translated into at least two languages. Other constructed languages like Toki Pona, Interlingua, Klingon, Lojban, and Ido also have a significant footprint.

Language technology 

From 2008 to 2011, Francis Bond used the Tatoeba Corpus for his research on the Japanese language. 

Since 2013, Jörg Tiedemann has been spreading Tatoeba parallel corpora more widely in the machine translation community by sharing them on the OPUS repository and organizing the "Tatoeba Translation Challenge". With the rise of deep learning, researchers increasingly use Tatoeba's data sets to train and evaluate their massively multilingual models in tasks like machine translation, language identification, semantic search, and speech recognition.

See also

 Phrase book
 Parallel text
 Common Voice
 Lingua Libre
 Wiktionary

References

External links

 
 Video of Trang Ho introducing Tatoeba at MozFest 2019
 Tatoeba's statistics
 Tatoeba Translation Challenge

Advertising-free websites
Computational linguistics
Corpora
Creative Commons-licensed websites
Free-content websites
French educational websites
Language learning software
Natural language processing
Open educational resources
Social networking language-learning websites